The 67th 1990 Lithuanian Athletics Championships were held at 1990.

Winners

External links 
 Lithuanian athletics

Lithuanian Athletics Championships
Lithuanian Athletics Championships, 1990
Lithuanian Athletics Championships